Macedonian Village is a rural residential hamlet in Whitby, Durham Region, Ontario, Canada.

History
The settlement was founded around 1945 by families from Macedonia who had first settled in nearby Toronto.

Phillips-Kozaroff Park is located in the centre of Macedonian Village, where a stone cairn reads, "this park donated by Stato Kozaroff and Vasil Phillips, October 1945".

Geography

References

Neighbourhoods in Whitby, Ontario